The Prodigal is a 1931 Pre-Code early talkie film starring Lawrence Tibbett, Esther Ralston, Roland Young and Hedda Hopper. The film was extremely provocative in its time in that it viewed adultery in a non-judgmental, even positive light.

See also
Pre-Code sex films

References

Sources
Doherty, Thomas Patrick. Pre-Code Hollywood: Sex, Immorality, and Insurrection in American Cinema 1930-1934. New York: Columbia University Press 1999.

External links

, excerpt

1931 films
1930s romantic musical films
Adultery in films
American black-and-white films
American romantic musical films
Films directed by Harry A. Pollard
Films scored by Herbert Stothart
Metro-Goldwyn-Mayer films
1930s English-language films
1930s American films